Daxing Subdistrict is a subdistrict in Songtao Miao Autonomous County, Guizhou, China. , it has 3 residential communities and 7 villages under its administration.

See also 
 List of township-level divisions of Guizhou

References 

Subdistricts of Guizhou
Songtao Miao Autonomous County